Opisthotropis laui, Lau's mountain stream snake,  is a species of natricine snake found in China.

References

Opisthotropis
Reptiles described in 2013
Reptiles of China